Craig Bruce Burden (born 13 May 1985 in Durban, South Africa) is a rugby union player for the  in Super Rugby and the Currie Cup. He attended Maritzburg College in Pietermaritzburg where he played at centre. Between 2006 and 2013, he played as a hooker for the Sharks.

In 2007 Burden attended the High Performance Player's Course at the International Rugby Academy NZ (IRANZ). Burden's Positional Coach was former Auckland Blues player Paul Mitchell and Course Facilitator former ITM Cup Coach for the Wellington Lions Chris Boyd.

He joined French Top 14 side Toulon as a medical joker in 2013.

He joined French Top 14 side Montpellier as a World Cup joker in July 2015.

He joined French Top 14 side Stade Français as a medical joker in November 2015.

Honours

Currie Cup: 2010

Toulon
Heineken Cup European Champions: 2014
Top 14 French League : 2014

References

External links

itsrugby.co.uk profile

1985 births
Living people
Alumni of Maritzburg College
Montpellier Hérault Rugby players
RC Toulonnais players
Rugby union hookers
Rugby union players from Durban
Sharks (Currie Cup) players
Sharks (rugby union) players
South Africa international rugby union players
South African people of British descent
South African rugby union players
Stade Français players
White South African people